Hajjaj ( or ) may refer to:

People
Al-Hajjaj ibn Yusuf (661-714), military governor of the Umayyad caliphate
Emad Hajjaj, Palestinian-Jordanian editorial cartoonist
Al-Ḥajjāj ibn Yūsuf ibn Maṭar (786-833), translated Euclid's Elements into Arabic
 Al-Hajjaj ibn Ustadh Hurmuz (d. 1009), Buyid general and governor
Muslim ibn al-Hajjaj, Islamic author of Hadith
Sheikh Yusuf Abu el Hajjaj, patron of the Abu Haggag Mosque

Places
Hajjaj, Iran, a village in Semnan Province, Iran
Abu Haggag Mosque

See also
Raef Haggag, full name of singer Raef
Hajj (disambiguation)